Ophiceras is a genus of smooth, evolute ceratitid ammonites from the Early Triassic, with a rounded venter. Fossils of the genus have been found in Armenia, Azerbaijan, China, Greenland, and India.

Diagnosis
The shell of Ophiceras evolute, whorls all showing, slowly increasing in height, and slightly embracing the previous. 
Umbilicus, wide and moderately deep. Surface ornamented with faint folds, which in some develop into coarse ribs in the mature growth stage, and transverse striae.  Suture is ceratitic, lobes and saddles usually long and narrow. (Smith, 1932. Arkell, 1957)

Taxonomy
Ophiceras is included in the Ophiceratidae according to the Treatise on Invertebrate Paleontology (Arkell, 1957), but was earlier placed in the Xenodiscidae in Smith (1932).

Five subgenera are recognized: Ophiceras (Ophiceras),  O. (Acanthophiceras), O. (Discophiceras), O. (Lytophiceras), O. (Metophiceras).

Ophiceras probably gave rise to Flemingites , which it somewhat resembles.

References

Further reading
 Arkell, W.J. et al., 1957. Mesozoic Ammonoidea. Treatise on Invertebrate Paleontology Part L. Geological Society and University of Kansas Press. 
 Smith, J.P. 1932. Lower Triassic Ammonoids of North America. US Geological Survey Professional Paper 167. 

Otoceratina
Ceratitida genera
Triassic cephalopods
Triassic animals of Asia
Ammonites of Asia
Triassic Armenia
Triassic Azerbaijan
Triassic China
Triassic India
Fossils of Armenia
Fossils of Azerbaijan
Fossils of China
Fossils of India
Fossil taxa described in 1880